The Jewish Home is an Orthodox Jewish and religious Zionist political party in Israel. It was originally formed by a merger of the National Religious Party, Moledet, and Tkuma in November 2008. However, Moledet broke away from the party after its top representative was placed only 17th on the new party's list for the 2009 Knesset elections, and instead ran on a joint list with Hatikva. Tkuma later also left to join the National Union.

For the 2013 elections, the Jewish Home and Tkuma parties ran a joint list under the leadership of the chairman of the Jewish Home, Naftali Bennett. The party ran with Tkuma again in the 2015 elections. In April 2019, Jewish Home ran on a joint list with Tkuma and Otzma Yehudit. The parties registered under the name Union of Right-Wing Parties. The party ran on a joint list (named Yamina) with Tkuma and the New Right in the September 2019 Israeli legislative election, though the joint list split into two factions on 10 October. Yamina ran again in the 2020 Israeli legislative election. Party leader Rafi Peretz announced on 5 January 2021 that he was retiring from politics. He was succeeded by Hagit Moshe as the leader of the party on 19 January 2021.

History
The National Religious Party and the National Union originally allied in order to run a joint list for the 2006 elections.

On 3 November 2008, it was announced that the NRP and the Moledet and Tkuma factions of the Union would merge to form a new party. However, the Ahi and Hatikva factions of the Union rejected the merger—their leaders, Effi Eitam and Aryeh Eldad, respectively, were both opposed to the party being a purely religious one, while Eitam was also unhappy that the new party would not hold primaries.

The party was initially nameless. Five names were proposed: HaBayit HaYehudi ("Jewish Home"), Shorashim ("Roots"), Atzma'ut ("Independence"), Shalem ("Whole"), and Amihai ("My Nation Lives"). In an on-line ballot, the members chose "Jewish Home".

Yaakov Amidror was chosen to head a public committee formed to choose the party's list for the 2009 elections. On 8 December 2008, Rabbi Professor Daniel Hershkowitz, a mathematician from the Technion, was chosen to head the new party.

When Jewish Home announced its candidate list for the upcoming elections, five of the top six slots went to ex-NRP members. MK Uri Ariel of Tkuma was the sole exception: He received the third slot. Polls then indicated Jewish Home would get five to seven seats, thus making the first six spaces highly contested. The ex-National Union members again complained. Ex-Moledet MK Benny Elon stated that he would not seek re-election, and was replaced on the candidate list by American immigrant Uri Bank. The remaining Moledet members broke away, and allied with Hatikva in a revived Union (Bank also later switched to the Union.)

On 25 December, Tkuma MK Ariel left Jewish Home, and joined the Union. This left Jewish Home as little more than a renamed NRP, which was also reflected in its motto "New Mafdal" (מפד"ל החדשה). In the 2009 election, the party won three seats.

In November 2012, the Jewish Home held separate primaries for the leadership of the party. My Israel leader Naftali Bennett won over incumbent MK Zevulun Orlev, winning more than two-thirds of the vote, and Orlev announced he was resigning from politics. A week later, primaries for the remaining members of the list were held, and Nissan Slomiansky, Ayelet Shaked, and Uri Orbach reached the top spots. With the National Union breaking up, Uri Ariel officially re-united Tkuma with the Jewish Home to run on a joint list in the 2013 Israeli elections. A few Moledet candidates were included. In the elections that were held on 22 January 2013, the Jewish Home won 12 seats. The Jewish Home entered the thirty-third government of Israel under prime minister Benjamin Netanyahu, and has 3 ministers (Bennett, Ariel, and Orbach) and 2 deputy-ministers (Eli Ben Dahan and Avi Wortzman).

As part of its 2013 coalition agreement, the Jewish Home had the right to veto any laws that would change the status quo on religious issues. In December 2013, the party vetoed a Yesh Atid-proposed bill that sought to give gay fathers equal tax benefits, saying it would have far-reaching implications on marriage laws. Currently, mothers receive more benefits than do fathers under the law, and thus, couples composed of two men are ineligible for certain tax breaks.

In December 2016, the party's member Shuli Mualem proposed the so-called Regulation Bill. The law seeks to legalize dozens of small outposts of settlements built in the occupied Palestinian territories on private ground of individual Palestinians.

The Regulation Law passed legislation on 6 February 2017. The law exclusively refers to Palestinians, and allows the government to expropriate land from individual Palestinians against their will for compensation up to 25% above the land's value.

On 16 November 2018, the Jewish Home issued a statement claiming that the party intended to withdraw from Netanyahu's coalition government, and demanded an early election "as soon as possible". This threat came after Netanyahu denied party leader Naftali Bennett's request to become the Defense Minister. On 18 November, Netanyahu reneged on an earlier pledge to remove Jewish Home member Eli Ben Dahan as Deputy Defense Minister. Bennett afterwards reneged on this pledge to withdraw on 19 November 2018, and agreed to abandon his push to become Defense Minister and keep the party in the coalition.

In December 2018, three Jewish Home MKs, including Bennett, left the party to form the New Right. Rafi Peretz was elected leader of the party on 4 February 2019.

In the build-up to the April 2019 elections, the party agreed to run on a joint list with Tkuma, and later joined the Union of Right-Wing Parties (URWP) alliance alongside Otzma Yehudit.

Prior to the September 2019 elections, the Jewish Home joined the Yamina alliance alongside New Right and Tkuma. Following the elections, the bloc split into separate Knesset factions on 10 October, one consisting of the Jewish Home and Tkuma, and the other New Right. However, the parties re-united to reform Yamina prior to the 2020 elections.

On 22 April 2020, it was reported that Bennett was now "considering all options" for the Yamina alliance's political future, including departing from Netanyahu's government, which had just agreed to a coalition with the leader of the opposition Blue and White party Benny Gantz, and joining the opposition. Bennett was reported to be unhappy with the new coalition government's decision to hold back on the issue of judicial reform.

On 14 May 2020, the Jewish Home unofficially left Yamina and joined the Netanyahu government, with Peretz becoming Jerusalem Minister. The party officially split from Yamina on 14 July 2020.

After winning just one seat when contesting the 2020 Israeli legislative election within the Yamina party, the Jewish Home left Yamina and joined the Thirty-fifth government of Israel. The party officially split from Yamina on 14 July 2020. Its leader, Rafi Peretz, was appointed Minister of Jerusalem and Ministry of Diaspora Affairs in the new government.

During the run-up to the 2021 Israeli legislative election, and amid poor showings in the polls, Peretz announced on 5 January 2021 that he would resign from his role as leader of the Jewish Home, and retire from politics, triggering a leadership election. The election was conducted on 19 January 2021, with 965 members of the Central Committee selecting the new leader. Those running were Hagit Moshe, the Deputy Mayor of Jerusalem, and Nir Orbach, the CEO of the Jewish Home. On 19 January, Hagit Moshe was elected to succeed Peretz as the leader of the Jewish Home with 472 votes (56.12%). On 4 February, Moshe announced that the Jewish Home will not contest the March 2021 election. The party held negotiations with different parties, but failed to find a running mate and did not register any electoral candidates. Orbach left the party, joined Yamina, and was placed sixth on its party list, going on to win a seat.

Yossi Brodny was chosen on 18 July 2022 to lead the party's slate ahead of the 2022 Israeli legislative election. The party allied with Yamina and a joint run, running under the name "The Jewish Home", was approved by the Central Committee of the party on 14 September 2022.

Ideology
The party primarily represents Modern Orthodox as well as Chardal Jews. For many years, this community has been politically fractured. In the 2013 elections, the party was led by Naftali Bennett, a charismatic high-tech millionaire, who appealed to both religious and secular Israelis. The party's pro-settlement message and Bennett's personal appeal helped it increase popularity among a broader segment of the population. The attention that Bennett received also apparently had an effect on Likud's 2013 election strategy, pushing it to the right. Along with Yesh Atid, the Jewish Home surged in popularity by promising to end the controversial system of draft exemptions given to many ultra-Orthodox seminary students, and to "ease the burden" on middle-class Israelis who serve in the military, work, and pay taxes. These two parties became the two largest coalition parties in Prime Minister Netanyahu's government, and leaders of both parties were able to force Netanyahu to promise that the ultra-Orthodox political parties will not be in the new coalition. Despite Bennett's alliance with Yesh Atid leader Yair Lapid on many domestic issues, the two differ sharply over peace efforts and settlement building. Bennett is opposed to the creation of a Palestinian state, and has called for Israel to annex Area C of the West Bank and offer citizenship to the Palestinians living there. Their alliance ended during their time as coalition partners, before the 2015 Israeli legislative election.

Most of the party's candidates for the 2015 elections were opposed to same-sex marriage. Some of the remarks made by its candidates have been called homophobic by Yair Lapid; Zehava Gal-On and Mickey Rosenthal also criticized the comments. Despite this, in a 2016 poll conducted for the Hiddush organization, 57% of Jewish Home voters said they back same-sex marriage or partnerships.

The party is considered to be part of the national camp in Israeli politics, a group of political parties that share nationalist views and often form governments together.

Criticism 
In response to the party's short-lived 2019 alliance with Otzma Yehudit, Rabbi Benny Lau, a modern Orthodox rabbi from Jerusalem, said: "A vote for Bayit Yehudi is a vote for the racism of [Meir] Kahane." The rabbi equated Kahanism with Nazism.

Leaders

Knesset election results

Knesset members list

References

External links

Notes 

Political parties in Israel
Political parties established in 2008
Religious Zionist political parties in Israel
2008 establishments in Israel
Neo-Zionism
Far-right political parties in Israel
Conservative parties in Israel
Social conservative parties
Religious Zionism
Orthodox Jewish political parties
Right-wing populist parties
Right-wing populism in Israel
Right-wing parties
Right-wing politics in Israel